HAT-P-6b is a transiting extrasolar planet discovered by Noyes et al. on October 15, 2007. It is located approximately 910 light-years away in the constellation of Andromeda, orbiting the star HAT-P-6. This hot Jupiter planet orbits with a semi-major axis of about 7.832 gigameters, and takes 92 hours, 28 minutes, 17 seconds and 9 deciseconds to orbit the star. It has true mass of 5.7% greater than Jupiter and a radius 33% greater than Jupiter, corresponding to a density of 0.583 g/cm3, which is less than water.

The planet HAT-P-6b is named Nachtwacht. The name was selected in the NameExoWorlds campaign by the Netherlands, during the 100th anniversary of the IAU, after Rembrandt's painting The Night Watch.

The sky projected angle between stellar and orbital axis is roughly 166°, making it one of the few planets that is in a retrograde orbit around its parent star. Observations made by Spitzer Space Telescope shows that the planet atmosphere has a weak temperature inversion, or no inversion at all, depending on how strong is the stellar chromospheric activity.

References

External links

 

Exoplanets discovered by HATNet
Hot Jupiters
Transiting exoplanets
Exoplanets discovered in 2007
Giant planets
Andromeda (constellation)
Exoplanets with proper names